Kaufbeuren (Bavarian: Kaufbeiren) is an independent town in the Regierungsbezirk of Swabia, Bavaria. The town is an enclave within the district of Ostallgäu.

Districts
Kaufbeuren consists of nine districts:
 Kaufbeuren (town core incl. historical town)
 Kaufbeuren-Neugablonz
 Oberbeuren
 Hirschzell
 Kleinkemnat
 Großkemnat
 Märzisried
 Ölmühlhang
 Sankt Cosmas

Mayors
Stefan Bosse (CSU) is the Lord Mayor of Kaufbeuren since November 2004. He was reelected in March 2014 with 57.48% of the votes and again in March 2020 with 54.5% of the votes.

Landmarks

 Town hall (built 1879–1881)
 Crescentiakloster (founded 1150)
 Historical town with partially conserved historical town wall
 St.-Martins-Kirche
 Fünfknopfturm (Five-Button-Tower)
 St.-Blasius-Kirche
 Hexenturm
 Gerberturm
 Pulverturm
 Münzturm
 Sywollenturm
 Zollhäuschen
 Stadttheater Kaufbeuren
 Kunsthaus Kaufbeuren

Museums
 Stadtmuseum
 Feuerwehrmuseum
 Puppentheater-Museum
 Isergebirgs-Museum (Neugablonz)

Notable people

Maria Crescentia Höss (1682–1744), nun, beatified 1900, canonised 2001
Sophie von La Roche (1730–1807), writer
Ludwig Ganghofer (1855–1920), writer
Rudolf Roessler (1897–1958), publisher and spy
Wilhelm Walcher (1910–2005), physicist
Hans Liebherr (1915–1993), master mason, inventor of the mobile tower crane and founder of the Liebherr
Hans Magnus Enzensberger (1929-2022), poet, writer and publisher
Walter Riester (born 1943), politician (SPD), Secretary of State for Employment 1998–2002
Erich Weishaupt (born 1952), ice hockey player
Dieter Hegen (born 1962), ice hockey player
Alexander Sulzer (born 1984), ice hockey player

Kaufbeuren Air Base
The Kaufbeuren Air Base was established as a Luftwaffe station in 1935. When seized by the United States Army in May 1945 at the end of World War II it was discovered to be the final location of Nazi Party's top secret FA signals intelligence and cryptanalytic agency. After serving as a U.S. airbase during the post-war period, the field was ultimately returned to the town on 16th December 1957, and today serves as a German Air Force training field.

Culture
The Tänzelfest is a festival, which takes place usually at the end of June. Children reenact the history of the town in traditional costume. There are a lot of events at this time.

Sports
The town is known for their ice hockey team ESV Kaufbeuren. They currently play in DEL2, the second level of ice hockey in Germany.

Twin towns – sister cities

Kaufbeuren is twinned with:
 Ferrara, Italy (1991)
 Szombathely, Hungary (1992)
 Jablonec nad Nisou, Czech Republic (2009)

References

External links

  
 kunsthaus kaufbeuren
 Stadtmuseum Kaufbeuren
 Tänzelfest in Kaufbeuren
 The history of Kaufbeuren

 
Free imperial cities
Swabian Circle
Swabian League